Ein Zivan is an Israeli settlement organized as a kibbutz in the northern Golan Heights, under the jurisdiction of the Golan Regional Council. The international community considers Israeli settlements in the Golan Heights illegal under international law, but the Israeli government disputes this.

History
The kibbutz was founded in 1968 by Israeli-born youth with a kibbutz background. Later they were joined by Gar'inei Nahal (Nahal core groups) and volunteers from abroad. In the 2000s a community expansion program was open to accommodate families seeking a high quality of life away from urban centers. The population of Ein Zivan today consists thus of kibbutz members (43 families) and residents (40 families). It was the first kibbutz to initiate the process of privatization of common property.

Demography
In November 2011 the kibbutz had a population of 83 families (243 people).

Economy
Ein Zivan's economy is based mostly on agriculture. It has one of the largest deciduous orchards, containing apples, cherries, peaches, pears and nectarines. The northern kibbutz also has vineyards, linked to the Golan Heights Winery.
Chocolatier Carina Chaplinsky, a new immigrant from Argentina, runs a chocolate business at the kibbutz that includes a factory, a boutique outlet, a workshop and tasting rooms. The Pelter Winery, established in 2002, is also located at Ein Zivan. The winery produced 85,000 bottles in 2010. Winemaker Tal Pelter has been hailed by Haaretz wine critic Daniel Rogov as a "rising star". Ein Zivan also runs a bed and breakfast establishment, Lan BaGolan.

See also
Commune
Israeli wine
Israeli-occupied territories

References

Israeli settlements in the Golan Heights
Kibbutzim
Populated places established in 1968
Golan Regional Council
Populated places in Northern District (Israel)
1968 establishments in the Israeli Military Governorate